Biały Potok  is a part of a  village Krościenko nad Dunajcem in the administrative district of Gmina Krościenko nad Dunajcem, within Nowy Targ County, Lesser Poland Voivodeship, in southern Poland, close to the border with Slovakia.

References

Villages in Nowy Targ County